Altogether is a greatest hits album released by pop group, The Nolans in 1982. It featured their seven consecutive top 20 hits and followed four top 20 albums by the group.

The album was released at the beginning of the group's decline in the UK, and the lead single, "Dragonfly" failed to chart. This song was a departure for the group, with it not being produced by either of their regular producers, Ben Findon or Nicky Graham, but by Tim Friese-Greene, who was responsible for the recent success of Tight Fit. The album itself also fared less well than expected when it peaked at No.52. It was also at this time that the group were back to being a five-piece, with the return of former member, Anne Nolan.

This was the last Nolans album released by Epic Records, and their final single with them came the following year.

Track listing

References

External links 
 
 

The Nolans albums
1982 compilation albums
Epic Records compilation albums